Greenwich is a town in southwestern Fairfield County, Connecticut, United States. At the 2020 census, the town had a total population of 63,518. The largest town on Connecticut's Gold Coast, Greenwich is home to many hedge funds and other financial services firms. Greenwich is a principal community of the Bridgeport–Stamford–Norwalk–Danbury metropolitan statistical area, which comprises all of Fairfield County.

Greenwich is the southernmost and westernmost municipality in Connecticut as well as in the six-state region of New England. The town is named after Greenwich, a royal borough of London in the United Kingdom.

History

The town of Greenwich was settled in 1640, by the agents Robert Feake and Captain Daniel Patrick, for Governor Theophilus Eaton of New Haven Colony, who purchased the land from the Siwanoy Indians in exchange of 25 English coats. One of the founders was Elizabeth Fones Winthrop, daughter-in-law of John Winthrop, founder and governor of the Massachusetts Bay Colony. What is now called Greenwich Point was known for much of the area's early history as "Elizabeth's Neck" in recognition of Elizabeth Fones and their 1640 purchase of the Point and much of the area now known as Old Greenwich. Greenwich was declared a township by the Connecticut General Assembly in Hartford on May 11, 1665.

During the American Revolution, General Israel Putnam made a daring escape from the British on February 26, 1779, in Greenwich. Although British forces captured and sacked the town, Putnam was able to warn Stamford.

In 1974, Gulliver's Restaurant and Bar, on the border of Greenwich and Port Chester, burned, killing 24 young people.

In 1983, the Mianus River Bridge, which carries traffic on Interstate 95 over an estuary, collapsed, resulting in the death of three people.

For many years, Greenwich Point (locally termed "Tod's Point"), was open only to town residents and their guests. However, a lawyer sued, saying his rights to freedom of assembly were threatened because he was not allowed to go there. The lower courts disagreed, but the Supreme Court of Connecticut agreed, and Greenwich was forced to amend its beach access policy to all four beaches in 2001. These beaches include Greenwich Point Park, Island Beach, Great Captain Island, and Byram Park.

Geography
In terms of area, Greenwich is twice the size of Manhattan. The town is bordered to the West by Port Chester, New York, Rye Brook, New York, and White Plains, New York. To the North it is bordered by Armonk, New York, and Banksville, New York. To the South it is bordered by the Long Island Sound. To the East, it is bordered by Stamford, Connecticut.

Neighborhoods and sections

The U.S. Census Bureau recognizes nine CDPs within the town: Byram, Cos Cob, Glenville, Indian Field, Old Greenwich, Pemberwick, Riverside, Rock Ridge and the Greenwich CDP covering the historic municipal center of the town. The USPS lists separate zip codes for "Greenwich"  (spanning two zip codes), Cos Cob, Old Greenwich, and Riverside, for a total of five zip codes, plus a sixth zip code for PO Box. Additionally, Greenwich is often further divided into several smaller, unofficial neighborhoods.

The Hispanic and Latin American population is concentrated in the southwestern corner of the town. In 2011, numerous neighborhoods were voted by the Business Insider as being the richest neighborhoods in America.

 Back Country
 Banksville (Connecticut side)
 Belle Haven
 Bruce Park
 Byram
 Chickahominy
 Cos Cob
 Edgewood
 Fourth Ward (Fourth Ward Historic District)
 Glenville
 Downtown/Central Greenwich
 Greenwich Cove
 Holly Hill
 Mianus
 Mid-Country
 Milbank
 Milbrook
 Municipal Center District
 North Mianus
 North Street (refers to the neighborhood surrounding North Street)
 Old Greenwich (Sound Beach)
 Palmer Hill
 Pemberwick
 Pine Hill
 Riverbank
 Riverside
 Riversville
 Rock Ridge
 Round Hill
 Stanwich

Historical sites
 Bush-Holley House
 Putnam Cottage
 Thomas Lyon House

Islands

More than half of the island (on the west side) is a bird sanctuary off-limits to members of the public without permission to visit. As of 2006 the island is available for overnight stays for those with permits, otherwise the east side is open from dawn until dusk.

Great Captain Island is also off the coast of Greenwich, and includes the southernmost point in Connecticut. There is a U.S. Coast Guard lighthouse on this island, as well as a designated area as a bird sanctuary. The lighthouse is a skeletal tower.

Island Beach or "Little Captain Island" once was the venue for the town's annual Island Beach Day. Ventriloquist Paul Winchell and his dummy, Jerry Mahoney, once came for a show, and on another occasion the Connecticut National Guard let adults and children fire machine guns into the water, according to an article in the Greenwich Time.

Island Beach has changed over the decades. The bathhouse once on the island's eastern shore is gone, and erosion is slowly eating away at the beaches themselves.

Climate
Greenwich experiences a humid continental climate (Dfa); however, it is quite close to a humid subtropical climate (Köppen climate classification Cfa). During winter storms, it is common for the area north of the Merritt Parkway to receive significantly heavier snowfall than the area closer to the coast, due to the moderating influence of Long Island Sound.

Demographics

At the 2020 U.S. census, there were 63,518 people in Greenwich. Per the American Community Survey's 2018 estimates, the population of Greenwich grew to 62,574. There were 24,234 housing units, 22,251 households, and 16,322 families in 2018. The town's racial makeup consisted of 72.8% non-Hispanic whites, 3.3% Blacks or African Americans, 0.1% American Indian or Alaska Natives, 7.6% Asian Americans, and 2.2% multiracial Americans. Hispanic and Latin American residents made up 13.8% of the estimated population.

The average household size from 2014 to 2018 grew to 2.78 and the average family size was 3.28. The median household income excluding capital gains was $142,819 and the average income was $272,636. Including capital gains, the median household income in 2014 was $511,411. The per capita income for the town was $98,467.

At the census of 2000, there were 61,101 people, 23,230 households, and 16,237 families residing in the town. At the census estimates of 2013, the racial makeup of the town was 80.90% White, 4.90% Black, 0.10% Native American, 7.80% Asian, 0.03% Pacific Islander, and 2.50% from two or more races. Hispanic or Latino of any race were 13.90% of the population.

There were 23,230 households, out of which 33.5% had children under the age of 18 living with them, 59.4% were married couples living together, 8.0% had a female householder with no husband present, and 30.1% were non-families. 24.8% of all households were made up of individuals, and 9.9% had someone living alone who was 65 years of age or older. The average household size was 2.60 and the average family size was 3.12.

In the town the population was spread out, with 25.4% under the age of 18, 4.1% from 18 to 24, 28.8% from 25 to 44, 25.7% from 45 to 64, and 15.9% who were 65 years of age or older. The median age was 40 years. For every 100 females, there were 90.1 males. For every 100 females age 18 and over, there were 85.2 males.

Wealth
Greenwich is home to two of the wealthiest zip codes in Connecticut, 06830 and 06831, with average adjusted gross incomes of $638,560 and $721,550, and median household incomes of $109,250 and $155,417, respectively. In recent decades, the town has attracted wealthy expats from around the globe due to its extremely low tax rate, school system, and proximity to Manhattan, which is an hour by Metro North (per mta.info).
The median listing price for a home in the town was $2.3 million in 2021. The coastal neighborhood of Belle Haven, along with Backcountry, have some of the wealthiest single family real estate in the world. In 2014, the highest asking price for a residential property in town was the Copper Beech Estate at $190 million. It later sold for $120 million.

Economy
Greenwich, along with Stamford, are the economic centers of Fairfield County and its metropolitan statistical area. Prominent companies based in the town of Greenwich are: AQR Capital, Blue Harbour Group, Blue Sky Studios/20th Century Animation, Blyth, Inc., Cambridge Solutions, First Reserve Corporation, Interactive Brokers, Nestlé Waters North America, North Street Capital, Silver Point Capital, Viking Global Investors, W. R. Berkley, a holding company for subsidiaries that sell property-casualty insurance, XFL, and XPO Logistics. Other major institutions in the township are Greenwich Hospital, Hyatt Regency, Tudor Investment Corporation, Eversource Energy, Brunswick School, and Camuto Group.

Arts and culture

Greenwich is home to the Greenwich International Film Festival, which acts in coordination with nonprofits to promote socially conscious filmmaking in the city's downtown in an annual June festival, in addition to screenings and events held year-round.

The Greenwich Symphony Orchestra begun in 1958 as the Greenwich Philharmonia, it became fully professional by 1967. The Greenwich Choral Society, founded in 1925, performs locally and elsewhere, including in New York City and Europe.

The Greenwich post office contains a mural, The Packet Sails from Greenwich Green, painted in 1939 by Victoria Hutson Huntley.

The Bruce Museum is a town-owned institution with sections devoted to art and natural history. Putnam Cottage (Knapp Tavern) historic house museum, is also located within Greenwich.

Acacia Lodge No. 85, Ancient, Free & Accepted Masons, founded in 1857 in the top level of the old Cos Cob School House, is located in the town. Its members were originally of Union Lodge No. 5, founded 1763, and though its "home base" was Stamford, it was given the jurisdiction of "Stamford, Horseneck and parts adjacent." Union Lodge often met in Greenwich, and the first recorded meeting place was Knapp's Tavern on the King's Highway.

Sports and recreation

Recreation
The Greenwich Y.M.C.A. and Greenwich Y.W.C.A. offer fitness and social services.

Arch Street, The Greenwich Teen Center has age-specific programs and events on weekdays and weekends.

Dorothy Hamill Rink is a town-owned ice rink open seasonally.

Beaches

The town has four beaches on Long Island Sound: 
Greenwich Point
Byram Beach
Island Beach (Little Captain's Island)
Great Captain Island

Private membership clubs

Greenwich Country Club
The Milbrook Club
Round Hill Club
The Stanwich Club
Burning Tree Country Club
Field Club of Greenwich
Tamarack Country Club
Fairview Country Club
Indian Harbor Yacht Club
Riverside Yacht Club
Belle Haven Club
Old Greenwich Yacht Club
Rocky Point Club
Greenwich Water Club
Greenwich Boat & Yacht Club
 Innis Arden Golf Club

Education

Public schools

Greenwich Public Schools operates the public schools. Greenwich High School is the district's sole high school.  elementary schools had the same pattern of racial segregation as the town as a whole with Hispanic students concentrated in the two elementary schools in the southwestern corner of the district, New Lebanon and Hamilton Avenue. The 3 middle schools have balanced enrollment. There is a Connecticut racial diversity law which requires that the percentage of students in an ethnic group in a school may not deviate by more than 25% from the average for the district. Thus, the district was out of compliance and was searching for solutions.

Elementary Schools:

Cos Cob School
Glenville School
 Hamilton Avenue School
International School at Dundee
 Julian Curtiss School
 New Lebanon School
 North Mianus School
 North Street School
 Old Greenwich School
 Parkway School
 Riverside School

Middle Schools:

 Central Middle School
 Eastern Middle School
 Western Middle School

High Schools:

 Greenwich High School

Private schools

Brunswick School, a non-sectarian boys' school (the brother school to Greenwich Academy) (Pre-K–12)
Greenwich Academy, a non-sectarian girls' school (the sister school to Brunswick) (Pre-K–12)
Eagle Hill School (K–10)
Convent of the Sacred Heart, a girls' school with Catholic affiliation (Pre-K–12)
 Greenwich Catholic School (Pre-K–8), 471 North Street (of the Roman Catholic Diocese of Bridgeport)
Greenwich Country Day School (originally nursery–9) (Acquired Stanwich School for 10–12, 2017)
Greenwich Japanese School, the New York Nihonjin gakko, a Japanese expatriate school (K–9), which moved to Greenwich from New York City in 1992; it shares the former Rosemary Hall campus with Carmel Academy.
Escuela Argentina en Greenwich (K–8), the only Spanish language international school in the New York metro.
The Stanwich School (Pre-K–12), located at 257 Stanwich Road
Carmel Academy (K–8), a Jewish school sharing a campus with Greenwich Japanese School. In 2010, the school changed its name from Westchester Fairfield Hebrew Academy.
Whitby School (18 months through grade 8), a Montessori and International Baccalaureate World School (IB).

Government and politics
The town of Greenwich is one political and taxing body, but consists of several distinct sections or neighborhoods, such as Banksville, Byram, Cos Cob, Glenville, Mianus, Old Greenwich, Riverside and Greenwich (sometimes referred to as central, or downtown, Greenwich). Of these neighborhoods, three (Cos Cob, Old Greenwich, and Riverside) have separate postal names and ZIP codes.

The town has three selectmen and a Representative Town Meeting (RTM). The RTM must approve all budgets, and consists of 230 elected representatives. RTM members are not paid.  The three selectmen are elected on a town-wide basis, although each person can only vote for two members. This assures that there will almost always be one Democrat and two Republicans or two Democrats and one Republican. While voter registration is skewed in the Republicans' favor, they do not have a lock on the First Selectman's chair, and Democrats have held the seat recently. Many of the other town committees have equal representation between Democrats and Republicans, regardless of the vote breakdown, since each individual can only vote for half as many seats as are available.

Voting History
Greenwich, Connecticut was a mostly Democrat jurisdiction up through 1892, voting for the Democrat in 13 of the 17 presidential elections from that party's founding in the mid-1820s up through 1892. Then the GOP would win Greenwich in 27 of the 28 presidential elections from 1896 to 2004, and in three of the last four presidential elections, the Democrat has carried the town.

The largest share of the vote received by a Democratic presidential candidate is the 64.56% of the vote received by Martin Van Buren in 1836, the largest share of the vote received by a Republican presidential candidate is the 78.25% of the vote received by Dwight D. Eisenhower in 1956, and the largest percentage of the vote receive by third-party presidential candidates was the 27.61% of the vote received by the third-party candidates in the 1912 presidential election. Most prominently, Theodore Roosevelt under the Bull Moose Party.

The results of Greenwich in all 49 presidential elections since 1828 can be found below:

Infrastructure

Transportation

The town is served by the Metro-North Railroad's New Haven Line (the four stations, from west to east, are Greenwich, Cos Cob, Riverside, and Old Greenwich) and is approximately a 50-minute train ride to Grand Central Terminal in Manhattan on the express train and a 60-minute ride on the local. The Amtrak Acela, Northeast Regional, and Vermonter trains stop in the adjacent city of Stamford.

Interstate 95 goes through the southern end of town, and there are four exits from I-95 in Greenwich, exits 2 through 5. The Boston Post Road (also known as East or West Putnam Avenue or simply Route 1) also goes through town, as does the Merritt Parkway, although the Merritt Parkway is a considerable distance from the downtown area. Interstate 684 passes through Greenwich, but cannot be entered or exited there, and the nearest interchange is at the Westchester County Airport in New York State.

Westchester County Airport is the closest commercial airport to Greenwich. It takes approximately 15 minutes to drive from the town's center. This is followed by LaGuardia Airport in Queens, New York, a 35-minute drive approximately. John F. Kennedy International Airport in Queens, New York, is the closest international airport, a one-hour drive approximately. Newark Liberty International Airport in New Jersey is also easily accessible from Greenwich, taking approximately one hour to drive to.

According to the DataHaven Community Wellbeing Survey, a statewide program funded by various agencies and philanthropies, 4% of adults in Greenwich are "transportation insecure," meaning that they have had to stay at home during the past year due to a lack of adequate transportation. The comparable rate for all adults statewide is 13%.

Fire department

The town of Greenwich is protected by the paid career members of the Greenwich Fire Department (GFD) and eight all-volunteer fire companies, in addition to a Fire Police Patrol. The paid GFD is made up of 106 paid firefighters, who staff 6 Engine Companies and 1 Truck Company, as well as several special units, in 6 Fire Stations (shared with volunteer companies), under the command of a Deputy Chief (Tour Commander) per shift, who in-turn reports to the Chief of Department. The 7 volunteer fire companies are made up of a total of approximately 100 volunteer firefighters, who man 9 volunteer engines, 2 volunteer ladders, 4 tankers, 6 squads, 3 utility units, 3 marine units (fireboats), 1 dive rescue unit, 1 special operations unit, 1 heavy rescue and several other support units. The volunteer fire companies are quartered in 7 of the fire stations, located throughout the town, and respond to emergency calls with the paid GFD Units. The all-volunteer fire companies are each commanded by a District Chief, who in-turn reports to a Deputy Chief of the GFD, who reports to the Chief of Department. There is also the Cos Cob Fire Police Patrol, one of the only remaining Fire Police Patrols in Fairfield County, Connecticut. The Patrol operates 2 Units, Patrol 2 (P2) and Utility 2 (U2). The paid Greenwich Fire Department and the 7 all-volunteer Greenwich Fire Companies respond to, on average, approximately 5,000 emergency calls annually.

Police department

Located at 11 Bruce Place, GPD has 87 police officers, 22 detectives, 19 sergeants, 10 lieutenants, 3 captains, and one deputy chief with 20+ civilian dispatchers and administrative personnel. and includes a K-9 unit.

Libraries 
Byram Shubert Library
Cos Cob Library
Greenwich Library
Perrot Library

Media

Newspapers and print
Greenwich Magazine, owned by Moffly Publications, which publishes other local magazines.
Greenwich Sentinel, local weekly printed newspaper.
 Greenwich Time, a daily newspaper based in Greenwich; published by Hearst Corporation, which also owns The Advocate of Stamford. Some sections are identical to the same sections in The Advocate, including the arts and business sections.

Films shot in Greenwich
List is in reverse chronological order of movies filmed (or partially filmed) in Greenwich:

 Boychoir (2014)
 The Big Wedding (2013)
 Great Hope Springs (2011)
 All Good Things (2010)
 The Switch (2010)
 The Best Laid Plans (2009)
 Listen to Your Heart (2009)
 Old Dogs (2009)
 A Smirk of Satisfaction (2009)
 Revolutionary Road (2008)
 The Accidental Husband (2008)
 The Life Before Her Eyes (2007)
 Person of Interest (2007)
 Borrowing Rebecca (2006)
 The Accidental Husband (2006)
 The Good Shepherd (2006)
 Holes in My Shoes (2006)
 The Path of Most Resistance (2006)
 After Roberto (2005)
 Domino One (2005)
 The Family Stone (2006)
 Figment (2005/II)
 Filmic Achievement (2005)
 R.I.P. (2005/I)
 The Stepford Wives (2004)
 Chubby Kid, A (2002)
 Fabled (2002)
 The Ice Storm (1997)
 Ransom (1996)
 Deadtime Stories (1986)
 Danny (1977)
 The April Fools (1968)
 Time Piece (1965)
 Open the Door and See All the People (1964)
 The American Venus (1926)
 Via Wireless (1915)
 The Perils of Pauline (1914)
 Two Little Waifs (1910)
 The Golden Supper (1910)
 The Cardinal's Conspiracy (1909)
 A Change of Heart (1909)
 The Country Doctor (1909)
 Sweet and Twenty (1909)
 Tender Hearts (1909)
 The Message (1909)
 The Little Teacher (1909)

Television shows filmed in Greenwich
 Sex/Life (2021) – partially set in Greenwich, though filmed mostly around Toronto
 The Mick (2017) – takes place in Greenwich. Not filmed in Greenwich
 The Profit (2014)
 The Big C (2011, 2012) Showtime
 Teachers (2008) – TV movie
 The Apprentice (2004)
 Wickedly Perfect (2004)
 Made in America (2003)
 Rich Girls (2003)
 Murder in Greenwich (2002) – TV movie about Martha Moxley
 TV Nation (1995)

Notable people

Sister cities

See also

 National Register of Historic Places listings in Greenwich, Connecticut
 History of Greenwich, Connecticut

References

External links

 
 Greenwich Chamber of Commerce
 
 

 
Towns in Fairfield County, Connecticut
Populated places established in 1640
Towns in the New York metropolitan area
Towns in Connecticut
Populated coastal places in Connecticut
1640 establishments in Connecticut